Sim is a town in Ashinsky District of Chelyabinsk Oblast, Russia, located on the Sim River,  west of Chelyabinsk, the administrative center of the oblast. Population:

History
It was founded in 1759 as Simsky Zavod (lit. Sim's Plant), a settlement around an ironworks. It was renamed Sim and granted town status on November 13, 1942.

Administrative and municipal status
Within the framework of administrative divisions, it is, together with two rural localities, incorporated within Ashinsky District as the Town of Sim. As a municipal division, the Town of Sim is incorporated within Ashinsky Municipal District as Simskoye Urban Settlement.

Notable people
It is the birthplace of Igor Kurchatov, a famous Soviet/Russian physicist.

References

Notes

Sources

Cities and towns in Chelyabinsk Oblast
Ufimsky Uyezd